XXR may refer to:

Little fresh meat (Chinese: xiǎo xiān ròu), Chinese slang for handsome young males, especially celebrities
Koropó language (ISO 639-3 code xxr), an extinct Brazilian language
XXR, an ISO 3166 placeholder code for an imaginary country